Kirihi Te Riri Maihi Kawiti  (17 April 1877 – 20 February 1964) was a New Zealand tribal leader, farmer and genealogist. Of Māori descent, he identified with the Ngāpuhi and Ngāti Hine iwi. He was born in Waiomio, Northland, New Zealand, on 17 April 1877. His father was Maihi Paraone Kawiti.

In the 1949 King's Birthday Honours, Kawiti was appointed an Officer of the Order of the British Empire for services to the Māori people.

References

1877 births
1964 deaths
New Zealand farmers
New Zealand genealogists
Ngāpuhi people
Ngāti Hine people
People from the Northland Region
New Zealand Officers of the Order of the British Empire